The Potez 39 was a French two-seat single-engined parasol wing monoplane reconnaissance and observation aircraft of the 1930s.

Development
The Potez 39 was designed to a 1928 requirement for an aircraft to replace the Potez 25 and Breguet 19 machines then in service with the French Air Force in the A2 (Artillerie Biplace - two seat observation aircraft) role. The aircraft was a parasol monoplane of all-metal construction, the first all metal Potez aircraft, with a tailwheel undercarriage. The crew of two sat in open, tandem cockpits, with the observer being armed with two Lewis guns on a ring mounting, and the pilot being armed with a single synchronised Darne machine gun, while light bombs could be carried in a small internal bomb-bay and on external racks. A fixed camera was fitted, operating through a hatch in the fuselage floor.

The prototype flew in January 1930. Although the Breguet 27 was selected as the winner of the competition, both it and the Potez, which was runner-up, were chosen for production. Compared to the Potez 25, of which over 2000 were ordered, production of the Potez 39 series was on a small scale, 100 Potez 390 aircraft being built for France and 12 Potez 391 variants, powered by a Lorraine-Dietrich 12H engine of 700 bhp, for the Peruvian Air Force. A number of prototype and development aircraft, including a floatplane, were tested but no further orders were received.

Service
First production aircraft were delivered in 1934 and the Potez 39 began to be replaced by ANF Les Mureaux 117, Amiot 143 and Potez 540 aircraft began in 1936. At the outbreak of World War II, the Potez 39 remained in service with seven observation squadrons of the French Air Force, but these, along with the Breguet 27-equipped units, were withdrawn from the front in October 1939. The Potez 39 continued to serve in training units until the armistice of June 1940, at which time 41 remained in Metropolitan France. These aircraft were scrapped soon afterward.

Variants

Potez 37
Two seat reconnaissance aircraft developed in parallel with Potez 39, with narrow tail boom replacing conventional rear fuselage. Unsuccessful, with only three built, the ANF-Les Mureaux 110 being preferred.
Potez 390 A2
 Two-seat observation aircraft for French Air Force. Powered by a Hispano-Suiza 12Hb engine.
Potez 39 Hy
Experimental floatplane version.
Potez 391
Variant of Potez 39 powered by  Lorraine-Dietrich 12H. 12 production versions built for Peru.
Potez 3910 R2
Experimental aircraft with  Hispano-Suiza 12Ybrs engine. One built.
Potez 3912
Experimental aircraft with  Renault 12 Jc engine. One built.
Potez 392A single prototype initially built with a  Hispano-Suiza 12Kb, later re-engined with a  Hispano-Suiza 12Xbr
Potez 393A single prototype powered by a  Hispano-Suiza 12Ybr
Potez 49
Sesquiplane conversion of Potez 39. The lower wing was designed to be easily removable, so the aircraft could be configured either as a monoplane or a biplane, according to mission. One built.

Operators

French Air Force

Peruvian Air Force

Soviet Air Force - One aircraft, used for tests and trials.

Specifications

See also

References

Further reading

Potez 039
039
Parasol-wing aircraft
Single-engined tractor aircraft
Aircraft first flown in 1930